The 1992–93 World Series was a One Day International (ODI) cricket tri-series where Australia played host to Pakistan and West Indies. Australia and West Indies reached the Finals, which West Indies won 2–0. This was the last series and the last time West Indies would wear a grey uniform in One Day Cricket.
Australia and West Indies would not play the best of 3 finals again until the 2000-01 One Day Series.

Points table

Result summary

Final series
West Indies won the best of three final series against Australia 2–0.

References

Australian Tri-Series
1992 in cricket
1993 in cricket
1992–93 Australian cricket season
1992–93
International cricket competitions from 1991–92 to 1994
1992 in Australian cricket
1993 in Australian cricket
1992–93
1992 in Pakistani cricket
1993 in Pakistani cricket